Elizabeth (also spelled Elisabeth; Hebrew: אֱלִישֶׁבַע / אֱלִישָׁבַע "My God has sworn", Standard Hebrew: Elišévaʿ / Elišávaʿ, Tiberian Hebrew: ʾĔlîšéḇaʿ / ʾĔlîšāḇaʿ; Greek: Ἐλισάβετ Elisabet / Elisavet) was the mother of John the Baptist, the wife of Zechariah, and maternal aunt of Mary, mother of Jesus, according to the Gospel of Luke and in Islamic tradition. She was past normal child-bearing age when she conceived and gave birth to John.

Biblical narrative
According to the Gospel of Luke chapter 1, Elizabeth was "of the daughters of Aaron". She and her husband Zechariah/Zachariah were "righteous before God, walking in all the commandments and ordinances of the Lord blameless", but childless. While he was in the temple of the Lord, Zachariah was visited by the angel Gabriel:

Zachariah doubted whereby he could know this since both he and his wife were old. The angel identified himself as Gabriel and told Zachariah that he would be "dumb, and not able to speak" until the words were fulfilled, because he did not believe. When the days of his ministry were complete, he returned to his house.

According to the account, the angel Gabriel was then sent to Nazareth in Galilee to her relative Mary, a virgin, betrothed to a man called Joseph, and informed her that she would conceive by the Holy Spirit and bring forth a son to be called Jesus. Mary was also informed that her "relative Elizabeth" had begun her sixth month of pregnancy, and Mary traveled to "a town in the hill country of Judah", to visit Elizabeth.

Matthew Henry comments, "Mary knew that Elizabeth was with child, but it does not appear that Elizabeth had been told anything of her relative Mary's being designed for the mother of the Messiah; and therefore what knowledge she appears to have had of it must have come by a revelation, which would be a great encouragement to Mary." After Mary heard Elizabeth's blessing, she spoke the words now known as the Magnificat. 

That is the last mention of Elizabeth, who is not mentioned in any other chapter in the Bible. The chapter continues with the prophecy of Zachariah (known as the Benedictus,) and ends with the note that John "grew, and became strong in spirit, and was in the deserts" until his ministry to Israel began; so it is unknown how long Elizabeth and her husband lived after that.

Since the Medieval era, Elizabeth's greeting, "Blessed are you among women, and blessed is the fruit of thy womb," has formed the second part of the Hail Mary prayer. 

A traditional "tomb of Elizabeth" is shown in the Franciscan Monastery of Saint John in the Wilderness near Jerusalem.

Apocrypha
Elizabeth is mentioned in several books of the Apocrypha, most prominently in the Protevangelion of James, in which the birth of her son, the subsequent murder of her husband, as well as her and John's miraculous escape during the Massacre of the Innocents are chronicled.

Sainthood
Elizabeth is revered as a saint in the Roman Catholic Church on 5 November, and in the Orthodox and Anglican traditions on 5 September, on the same day with her husband Zacharias/Zechariah. She is commemorated as a matriarch in the Calendar of Saints (5 September) of the Lutheran Church–Missouri Synod and Zacharias is commemorated as a prophet.

She is also commemorated on 30 March in Eastern Orthodox Church (Visitation).

Islam
Elizabeth (Arabic: , daughter of ), the wife of Zakaria, the mother of Yahya, is an honored woman in Islam. Although Zachariah himself is frequently mentioned by name in the Qur'an, Elizabeth, while not mentioned by name, is referenced. She is revered by Muslims as a wise, pious and believing person who, like her relative Mary, was exalted by God to a high station. She lived in the household of Imran, and is said to have been a descendant of the prophet and priest Harun.

Zachariah and his wife were both devout and steadfast in their duties. They were, however, both very old and they had no son. Therefore, Zachariah would frequently pray to God for a son. This was not only out of the desire to have a son but also because the great Jesus wanted someone to carry on the services of the Temple of prayer and to continue the preaching of the Lord's message before his death.
God cured Elizabeth's barrenness and granted Zachariah a son, Yahya (John the Baptist), who became a prophet. God thus granted the wishes of the couple because of their faith, trust and love for God. In the Qur'an, God speaks of Zachariah, his wife, and John, and describes the three as being humble servants of the Lord:

In Sunni Islamic reports of al-Tabari and al-Masudi, Elizabeth is said to have been a daughter of Imran, and thus, a sister of Mary. Therefore, their children Jesus (Isa) and John (Yahya) are believed to have been cousins. In other accounts, Elizabeth is said to be a daughter of Fakudh, and a sister of Imran's wife Hannah.

In Shia hadith she is named Hananah, and is identified as a sister of Mary's mother Hannah. Abu Basir recorded that Imam Ja'far al-Sadiq, the great grandson of the Islamic Prophet Muhammad, had stated: "Hannah, the wife of Imran, and Hananah, the wife of Zechariah, were sisters. He goes on to say that Mary was born from Hannah and John was born from Hananah. Mary gave birth to Jesus and he was the son of the daughter of John's aunt. John was the son of the aunt of Mary, and the aunt of one's mother is like one's aunt."

Mandaeism
In Mandaeism, Enišbai is the Mandaic name for Elizabeth, the mother of John the Baptist. Enišbai is mentioned in chapters 18, 21, and 32 of the Mandaean Book of John.

See also
 Gospel of Luke
 Visitation (Catholic feast)
 Ein Kerem, traditional home town of Elizabeth, Zechariah and John
 Biblical figures in Islamic tradition
 Saint Elizabeth, patron saint archive

Notes and references

External links

 Stained glass depiction of Elizabeth and Zachary, Cathédrale Saint-Etienne de Bourges

1st-century BC births
1st-century deaths
1st-century BC women
1st-century Christian female saints
Family of Jesus
Gospel of Luke
People in the canonical gospels
Prophets of the New Testament
Saints from the Holy Land
Christian saints from the New Testament
Women in the New Testament
Joachim
1st-century BC Christian saints
Judean people
New Testament people in Mandaeism

gl:Isabel#Relixión